The following is a partial list of Coptic Orthodox churches in the United States; the count stands at more than 287  churches and communities:

Diocese of Southern United States
The hierarch of this diocese is Anba Youssef. He is assisted by two general bishops, Anba Basil and Anba Gregory.

Alabama
St. John Kame Coptic Orthodox Church, Birmingham
Coptic Community, Mobile

Arizona
St. Mark Coptic Orthodox Church, Scottsdale
St. Mary Coptic Orthodox Church, Peoria
St. John the Beloved Coptic Orthodox Church, Tucson
St. Joseph the Carpenter Coptic Orthodox Church, Phoenix 
Coptic Community, Northern Arizona
Archangel Michael American Coptic Orthodox Church, Paradise Valley

Arkansas
St. George Coptic Orthodox Church, Little Rock

Florida
Archangel Michael Coptic Orthodox Church, Melbourne
St. Anthony Coptic Orthodox Church, Maitland
St. Athanasius Coptic Orthodox Church, Pensacola
St. Demiana Coptic Orthodox Church, Jacksonville
St. George Coptic Orthodox Church, Daytona Beach
St. George Coptic Orthodox Church, Tampa
St. John the Baptist Coptic Orthodox Church, Miramar
St. Mark Coptic Orthodox Church, Fort Myers
St. Mary Coptic Orthodox Church, Delray Beach
St. Mary & Archangel Michael Coptic Orthodox Church, Oviedo
St. Mary & St. George Coptic Orthodox Church, Tallahassee
St. Mary & St. Mina Coptic Orthodox Church, Clearwater
St. Mary Magdalene Coptic Orthodox Church, Gainesville
St. Peter Seal of the Martyrs Coptic Orthodox Church, West Palm Beach
St. Philopateer Coptic Orthodox Church, Vero Beach
St. Philopateer Coptic Orthodox Church, Palm Harbor, Florida
St. Rebekah Coptic Orthodox Church, Orlando
St. Reweis Coptic Orthodox Church, Wesley Chapel
St. Simon the Tanner Coptic Orthodox Church, Sarasota
St. Verena Coptic Orthodox Church, New Port Richey
St. Stephen Christian Retreat Center, Titusville
Coptic Community, Crystal River
Coptic Community, Davenport
Coptic Community, Destin
Coptic Community, Keys
Coptic Community, Panama City
Coptic Community, Wildwood

Georgia
Archangel Michael Coptic Orthodox Church, Macon
St. Abanoub Coptic Orthodox Church, Savannah
St. Augustine Coptic Orthodox Church, Augusta
St. Mary Coptic Orthodox Church, Roswell
St. Paul Coptic Orthodox Church, Suwanee
St. Anthony Coptic Orthodox Church, Peachtree City 
Debre Geezan Medhanealem Eritrean Orthodox Tewahdo Church, Lithonia

Louisiana
St. Barbara Coptic Orthodox Church, Shreveport
St. Mark Coptic Orthodox Church, New Orleans
St. Mary of Egypt Coptic Orthodox Church, Lafayette

New Mexico
St. Pishoy Coptic Orthodox Church, Albuquerque

Oklahoma
St. Mary & St. Demiana Coptic Orthodox Church, Oklahoma City
St. Peter & St. Paul Coptic Orthodox Church, Tulsa
St. Samuel the Confessor Coptic Orthodox Church, Lawton

Tennessee
Archangel Michael Coptic Orthodox Church, La Vergne
St. Athanasius Coptic Orthodox Church, Ooltewah
St. George Coptic Orthodox Church, Nashville
St. Mark Coptic Orthodox Church, Nashville
St. Mary Coptic Orthodox Church, Knoxville
St. Mary Coptic Orthodox Church, Nashville
St. Mary & St. Rueis Coptic Orthodox Church, Memphis
St. Mina Coptic Orthodox Church, Nashville
St. Pishoy Coptic Orthodox Church, Antioch
St. Abba Sarapamone Coptic Orthodox Church, Clarksville

Texas
Archangel Raphael Coptic Orthodox Church, Houston
St. Mary and Archangel Michael Coptic Orthodox Church, Houston
St. Paul Coptic Orthodox Church, Houston
St. Abanoub Coptic Orthodox Church, Euless
St. Anthony Coptic Orthodox Church, San Antonio
St. Meena Coptic Orthodox Church, Fort Worth
St. George Coptic Orthodox Church, Arlington
St. George Coptic Orthodox Church, Katy
St. George Coptic Orthodox Church, Lubbock
St. Julitta Coptic Orthodox Church, Pearland
St. Mark Coptic Orthodox Church, Bellaire
St. Mary Coptic Orthodox Church, Colleyville (co-located with the Southern Diocese headquarters)
St. Philopateer Coptic Orthodox Church, Richardson
St. Stephen Coptic Orthodox Church, Cypress
The Holy Cross Coptic Orthodox Church, Round Rock
Coptic Community, Beaumont
Coptic Community, College Station
St Mary and St. Moses Abbey, Corpus Christi

Diocese of Los Angeles, Southern California and Hawaii 
The hierarch of this diocese is Anba Serapion. He is assisted by two general bishops: Bishop Abraham and Bishop Kyrillos.

Southern California
Archangel Michael Coptic Orthodox Church, Santa Ana
Archangel Michael Coptic Orthodox Church, Simi Valley
Archangels Michael & Gabriel Coptic Orthodox Church, Fresno
Archangel Raphael & St. Mina Coptic Orthodox Church, Palmdale
Christ the Good Shepherd American Coptic Orthodox Church, Long Beach, California
Christ the Redeemer American Coptic Orthodox Church, Lakewood, California
Christ the Savior American Coptic Orthodox Church, Sherman Oaks
Holy Annunciation Coptic Orthodox Church, Hawthorne
Holy Cross Coptic Orthodox Church, Oceanside
Holy Cross Coptic Orthodox Church, San Diego
Holy Resurrection American Coptic Orthodox Church, Los Angeles
Holy Transfiguration Coptic Orthodox Church, Chino
Holy Virgin Mary & St. Bishoy Coptic Orthodox Church, Los Angeles
St. Abanoub & St. Anthony Coptic Orthodox Church, Norco
St. Anthony Coptic Orthodox Monastery, Newberry Springs
St. Bishoy & St. Paul Coptic Orthodox Church, Los Angeles
St. Cyril of Alexandria Coptic Orthodox Church, Irwindale
St. Demiana Coptic Orthodox Church, Bakersfield
St. Demiana Coptic Orthodox Church, San Diego
St. George Coptic Orthodox Church, Bellflower
St. George & St. Bishoy Coptic Orthodox Church, Visalia
St. George the New Martyr Coptic Orthodox Church, Hemet
St. John Coptic Orthodox Church, Covina
St. John the Baptist Coptic Orthodox Church, Oxnard
St. Justina Coptic Orthodox Church, Rancho Cucamonga
St. Marina Coptic Orthodox Church, Irvine
St. Mark Coptic Orthodox Church, Los Angeles
St. Mary Coptic Orthodox Church, Victorville
St. Mary & St. Athanasius Coptic Orthodox Church, Northridge
St. Mary & St. Verena Coptic Orthodox Church, Yorba Linda
St. Mary Magdalene Coptic Orthodox Church, Palm Springs 
St. Mary of Egypt Coptic Orthodox Church, Newhall
St. Maurice & St. Verena Coptic Village Retreat Center, Big Bear Lake
St. Maurice Coptic Orthodox Church, Pomona
St. Mercurius & St. Abraam Coptic Orthodox Church, Torrance
St. Mina Coptic Orthodox Church, Colton
St. Paul American Coptic Orthodox Church, Tustin
St. Peter & St. Paul Coptic Orthodox Church, Santa Monica
St. Pope Kyrillos VI Coptic Orthodox Church, Westminster
St. Thomas the Hermit Coptic Orthodox Church, Temecula
St. Verena & The Three Holy Youth Coptic Orthodox Christian Center, Orange
The Three Abba Makari Coptic Orthodox Church, Santa Maria

Hawaii
St. Mark Coptic Orthodox Church, Honolulu

Diocese of New York & New England
The hierarch of this diocese is Anba David.

Connecticut
Virgin Mary & Archangel Michael Coptic Orthodox Church, Hamden
St. Peter & St. Andrew Coptic Orthodox Church, Stamford
Coptic Community, Waterbury
Coptic Community, Waterford

Maine
St. Karas and St. Pishoy, Bangor

Massachusetts
Holy Virgin Mary Spiritual Vineyard, Charlton
St. Mark Coptic Orthodox Church, Natick
St. Mary & St. George Coptic Orthodox Church, Marshfield
St. Mary of the Assumption Coptic Orthodox Church, Milford
St. Paul and St. John Chrysostom Coptic Orthodox Church, Boston
St. Philopateer and St. Mina Coptic Orthodox Church, Wayland
The Holy Family Coptic Orthodox Church, Attleboro

New Hampshire
St. Mary and Archangel Michael, Nashua holy

New York

Archangel Michael & St. Mena Coptic Orthodox Church, Great Kills (Staten Island)
St. George Coptic Orthodox Church, Astoria (Queens)
St. George Coptic Orthodox Church, Brooklyn
St. Helena & St. Anasimone Coptic Orthodox Church, Flushing
St. Mark Coptic Orthodox Church, Manhattan
St. Mark Coptic Orthodox Church, West Henrietta
St. Mark & St. Abraam Coptic Orthodox Church, Woodbury (Long Island)
St. Mary & St. Antonios Coptic Orthodox Church, Ridgewood (Queens)
St. Mary & St. Demiana Coptic Orthodox Church, White Plains
St. Mary & St. George Coptic Orthodox Church, Albany
St. Mary & St. Mina Coptic Orthodox Church, Syracuse
St. Mary & St. Moses the Black Coptic Orthodox Church, North Tonawanda
St. Peter & St. Paul Coptic Orthodox Mission, Rochester
St. Shenouda Monastery, West Henrietta
Virgin Mary & St. George Coptic Orthodox Church, Tottenville (Staten Island)
Virgin Mary & St. Pachomious Coptic Orthodox Church, Stony Point

Rhode Island
St. Mary and St. Mena Coptic Orthodox Church, Cranston

Vermont
St. Mary & Archangel Raphael Coptic Orthodox Church, Burlington

Diocese of North Carolina, South Carolina, and Kentucky 
The hierarch of this diocese is Anba Peter.

North Carolina
Archangel Michael & St. Philopateer Coptic Orthodox Church, Winston-Salem
Archangel Raphael & St. John the Beloved Coptic Orthodox Church, Chapel Hill
St. Mark Coptic Orthodox Church, Charlotte
St. Mary Coptic Orthodox Church, Raleigh

South Carolina
Archangel Michael Coptic Orthodox Church, Greenville
St. Mark Coptic Orthodox Church, Myrtle Beach
St. Mary Coptic Orthodox Church, Mauldin
St. Mary & St. George Coptic Orthodox Church, Charleston
St. Mary & St. Mina Coptic Orthodox Church, Fort Mill

Kentucky
Holy Virgin Mary & St. Philopateer Coptic Orthodox Church, Lexington
St. Mark Coptic Orthodox Church, Louisville

Diocese of Pennsylvania, Maryland, Delaware and West Virginia
The hierarch of this diocese is Anba Karas.

Pennsylvania
St. Anthony Coptic Orthodox Church, Annville
St. George Coptic Orthodox Church, Norristown (Philadelphia)
St. Mark Coptic Orthodox Church, Harrisburg
St. Mary Coptic Orthodox Church, Ambridge
St. Mary Coptic Orthodox Church, Silver Spring
St. Mary & St. Bishoy Coptic Orthodox Church, Allentown
St. Mary & St Kyrillos Coptic Orthodox Church, Hatfield
St. Mary & St. Mercurios Coptic Orthodox Church, Devon
St. Mina Coptic Orthodox Church, Altoona
Virgin Mary & St. Marina Coptic Orthodox Church, Mount Pocono
St. Mina & Pope Kyrillos Coptic Orthodox Church, Carlisle

Maryland
St. Barnabas & St. Susanna Coptic Orthodox Church]l, Baltimore
St. George Coptic Orthodox Church, Cabin John
St. Mary Coptic Orthodox Church, Cooksville

Delaware
Saint Mary Coptic Orthodox Church Of Delaware, Newark

West Virginia
St. Mary & Archangel Gabriel Coptic Orthodox Church, Charleston
Archangel Gabriel and Saint Mena Coptic Orthodox Church,  Huntington

Diocese of Ohio, Michigan and Indiana
The hierarch of this diocese is Anba Seraphim.

Ohio
St. George Coptic Orthodox Church, Waterville (Toledo)
St. Mark Coptic Orthodox Church, Seven Hills (Cleveland) 
St. Mary Coptic Orthodox Church, Columbus
St. Mary & St. John Convent, Warren
St. Mina & St. Abanoub Coptic Orthodox Church, Miamisburg (Dayton)
St. Peter & St. George Coptic Orthodox Church, Westlake (Cleveland)

Michigan
St. Mark Coptic Orthodox Church, Troy
St. Mary Coptic Orthodox Church, Ann Arbor
St. Mary & St. Mina Coptic Orthodox Church, Grand Rapids
St. Mary & St. Philopateer Coptic Orthodox Church, Troy
St. Mina Coptic Orthodox Church, Mio
Holy Cross Coptic Orthodox Church, Farmington Hills
The Coptic Orthodox Community of Lansing

Indiana
St. Mary & St. Mark Coptic Orthodox Church, Indianapolis

Diocese of Northern California and the Pacific Northwest

California
St. Antonius Coptic Orthodox Church, Hayward
St. George & St. Joseph Coptic Orthodox Church, Campbell (San Jose)
St. Mark Coptic Orthodox Church, Monterey
St. Mark Coptic Orthodox Church, Ripon (Modesto)
St. Mary Coptic Orthodox Church, Roseville (Sacramento) 
St. Mary & St. John Coptic Orthodox Church, Pleasanton
St. Mary & St. Mina Coptic Orthodox Church, Concord

Washington
St. George Coptic Orthodox Church, Kirkland
St. Mary Coptic Orthodox Church, Lynnwood
St. Mark Coptic Orthodox Church, Bonney Lake
St. Mina and Pope Kyrillos VI Coptic Orthodox Church, Bothell
St. Philopater & St. Demiana Coptic Orthodox Church, Lynnwood
Archangels Coptic Orthodox Church, Everett

Oregon
St. Antonious Coptic Orthodox Church, Portland
St. Mary & Martyr Marina Coptic Orthodox Church Gresham

Archdiocese of North America
This archdiocese is directly under the responsibility of the Pope of Alexandria. It includes all churches in North America that are not under the jurisdiction of a diocese. There is an Exarch of the Throne and one General Bishop serving this archdiocese, who is directly under the responsibility of the Pope of Alexandria:
Anba Michael, Suffragan Bishop of the Holy Suffragan Diocese of Alexandria and all Virginia, USA; suffragan to the Archdiocese of North America, which is currently under Patriarchal jurisdiction.

The following churches are under the jurisdiction of the Archdiocese of North America:

Colorado
St. Mark Coptic Orthodox Church, Centennial (Denver)

Idaho
Virgin Mary & St. Mark Coptic Orthodox Church, Boise

Illinois
St. Mary Coptic Orthodox Church, Palatine, (Chicago)
St. Mark Coptic Orthodox Church, Burr Ridge 
St. George Coptic Orthodox Church,(Monee, Illinois), (Chicago)
St. Paul Coptic Orthodox Mission Church, (Chicago)
St. Mina & St. Pope Kyrillos VI Coptic Orthodox Church, (Urbana)

Iowa
St. Mary Coptic Orthodox Church, Urbandale (Des Moines)
Coptic Community, Burlington
St. Mary & St. George Coptic Orthodox Church, Council Bluffs (former location; while the building still exists and is still owned by the Coptic Orthodox Church, services have been moved to a new building in Omaha, Nebraska)

Minnesota
St. Mary Coptic Orthodox Church, South St. Paul
St. George Coptic Orthodox Church, Plymouth

Missouri
St. Mary & St. Abraam Coptic Orthodox Church, St. Louis

Montana
St. Mary & St. Karas, Billings

Nebraska
St. Mary & St. George Coptic Orthodox Church, Omaha (formerly located in Council Bluffs, Iowa, the Church has recently moved its services to a new building constructed in Omaha to be closer to its members and abide more fully with its archdiocesan designation as the Coptic Orthodox Church in Omaha)

Nevada
St. Mary Coptic Orthodox Church, Las Vegas

New Jersey

Anba Moussa the Strong & St. Abraam Coptic Orthodox Church, Piscataway Township
Archangel Michael Coptic Orthodox Church, Howell Township
David the Prophet & St. Karas Coptic Orthodox Church, Oakland
Queen St. Mary & Prince Tadros I Coptic Orthodox Church, Spotswood
St. Abanoub & St. Antonious Coptic Orthodox Church, Bayonne
St. Anianus Coptic Orthodox Church, Princeton
St. Anthony Coptic Orthodox Church, Medford
St. Antonious & St. Mina Coptic Orthodox Church, East Rutherford
St. Augustine & St. Monica Coptic Orthodox Church, Summit 
St. George & St. Shenouda Coptic Orthodox Church, Jersey City
St. John & St. Mary Magdalene Coptic Orthodox Church, Morris Plains
St. Mark Coptic Orthodox Church, Cedar Grove
St. Mark Coptic Orthodox Church, Jersey City
St. Mary Coptic Orthodox Church, East Brunswick
St. Mary & St. Athanasius Coptic Orthodox Church, Hillsborough Township
St. Mary & St. Bishoy Coptic Orthodox Church, Elizabeth
St. Mary & St. Mercurius Coptic Orthodox Church, Belleville
St. Mary & St. Paula Coptic Orthodox Church, Barnegat Township
St. Mary & St. Stephen Coptic Orthodox Church, South River
St. Mary, St. Shenouda, & St. Thomas Coptic Orthodox Church, Hamilton Township
St. Mina Coptic Orthodox Church, Holmdel Township
St. Paul Coptic Orthodox Church, McKee City
Virgin Mary & St. John Coptic Orthodox Church, Bayonne
St. Mary and Archangel Raphael Coptic Orthodox Church, Old Bridge Township
St. Mary Of Egypt and St. Timothy The Apostle Coptic Orthodox Church, Cranbury

Utah
St. Mary Coptic Orthodox Church, Salt Lake City

Virginia
Archangel Michael & St. Anthony Coptic Orthodox Church, Richmond
St. Abanoub Coptic Orthodox Church, Springfield
St. George Coptic Orthodox Church, Hampton
St. Joseph the Carpenter Coptic Orthodox Church, Gainesville
St. Marina Coptic Orthodox Church, Winchester
St. Mark Coptic Orthodox Church, Fairfax
St. Mary Coptic Orthodox Church, Roanoke
St. Mary Coptic Orthodox Church, Yorktown
St. Mary & St. John the Baptist Coptic Orthodox Church, Staunton
St. Mary & St. Mercurius Coptic Orthodox Church, Stafford
St. Mina & St. Pope Kyrillous Coptic Orthodox Church, Moseley
St. Moses Coptic Orthodox Church, Ashburn
St. Philopateer Coptic Orthodox Church, Fairfax
St. Pope Kyrillos Coptic Orthodox Church, Chantilly
St. Timothy & St. Athanasius Coptic Orthodox Church, Arlington

Wisconsin
St. Mary & St. Anthony Coptic Orthodox Church, Milwaukee
St. Mary & St. Rewais Coptic Orthodox Church, Madison
Virgin Mary & Archangel Michael Coptic Orthodox Church, Springfield

US Territories
In addition to the confederated states, several other areas belong to territories officially held under the United States:

US Virgin Islands
St. Mark Coptic Orthodox Church, St. Thomas

Gallery

See also
Coptic American
List of Coptic Churches in Egypt
List of Coptic Orthodox Churches in Canada
Coptic Orthodox Church in North America
Coptic Orthodox Church in the United States
Pope Shenouda III of Alexandria
Oriental Orthodoxy
Oriental Orthodoxy in North America

References

External links
Coptic Orthodox Church Listings & Statistics
Coptic Orthodox Directory of Churches in the United States
Directory of Priests in Canada & the US
Coptic Orthodox Church of St. Mark, the first Coptic Church in the United States
Coptic Orthodox Diocese of Los Angeles
Coptic Orthodox Diocese of the Southern United States
Coptic Orthodox Archdiocese of North America

United States
Lists of churches in the United States
Denominational subdivisions in North America
Oriental Orthodoxy-related lists
United States